Kashmora is a 1986 Indian Telugu-language horror film, produced by M. Sudhakar Reddy under the Ushodhaya Movies banner and directed by N. B. Chakravarthy. It stars Rajendra Prasad, Dr. Rajasekhar and Bhanupriya. The music was composed by Chakravarthy. The film was recorded as a Super Hit at the box office.

Plot
The film begins, 3 people, Sridhar (Sarath Babu), Jaya Dev (Sridhar) & Abraka Dhabara (Nutan Prasad), eliminating a sorcerer Khadra (Bheemaraju) in a remote village Bista to protect Sridhar's sister Tulasi (Bhanu Priya) from Kashmora powerful black magic. Vishachi (Rajanala), the head of wizards, creates another powerful sorcerer Darkha (Rajendra Prasad) take avenge against homicides of Khadra. Darkha takes a pledge to slay them and the only source to find them is Thulasi, that too within a year since Kashmora waking up to slaughter Thulasi. After facing many troubles, Darkha reaches the city, a priest (P. J. Sarma) educates him to live in the modern society, he also identifies him as a sorcerer and takes an assurance never misuse his power on innocent people. Parallelly, the 3 friends are continuing their friendship even Dr. Rambabu (Dr. Rajashekar) son of Jayadev, Shadow (Shubhaleka Sudhakar) brother of Abraka Dabra, & Tulasi are also good friends. Once Tulasi challenges to bring out the reality of a fake god-woman Siddeshwari (Jaya Chitra) who displays parlor tricks to cheat people. At the same time, Siddeshwari learns regarding Darkha, she kidnaps him to use his abilities to increase her following, but he refuses. So, she decides to kill him when Thulasi & Shadow intervenes, protects him and exposes Siddeshwari but she absconds. Here Darkha recognizes Thulasi finds out the whereabouts of the 3 and gets ready to take the revenge. Simultaneously, Siddeshwari also challenges to destroy Thulasi, Darkha, & Shadow and executes her plan using by hypnotizing Rambabu who slow poisons Thulasi.

Meanwhile, Darkha tries to wipe out Sridhar, but unfortunately, his daughter Archana (Baby Seeta) dies where a transformation starts in Darkha towards humanity. Ahead, Thulasi's health goes on wrest due to slow poison. Next Darkha hits Abraka Dabra, aims to knock out his wife Saku (Anitha) through black magic, who is none other than the daughter of his mentor priest, he reverses it and dies. Viewing his death, the humanity inside Darkha awakes and takes a vow not to harm any creature in the universe. Thereafter, he again falls into the clutches of Siddeshwari but manages to escape, reaches Shadow and reveals her evil deed towards Thulasi. Now, Darkha & Shadow get back Rambabu normal with the help of Jayadev. Parallelly, the one-year period completes and Kashmora attacks Thulasi. Darkha struggles to bar it using his skills. In the meantime, Sridhar reaches Siddeshwari's through her, he learns regarding Darkha's revenge. After her arrest, when Sridhar goes back home, he spots Darkha is drawing a Sri Chakram to protect Thulasi, but Sridhar misunderstands and throws him out of the house. Eventually, Tulasi is mislaid and she has been called to burial ground by Vishachi, who arrived from Bista. At present, Darkha too lands when the combat arrises between Vishachi & Darkha, one as the destroyer another as the protector of Thulasi. At last, Darkha succeeds in stopping Kashmora by offering his soul, puts Vishachi to death when Sridhar arrives and fires on him. Before dying, Darkha asks everyone to remember him in their heart that a wizard died for goodwill.

Cast

Rajendra Prasad as Darkha
Dr. Rajasekhar as Ram Babu  
Bhanupriya as Thulasi
Sarath Babu as Sridhar
Nutan Prasad as Abraka Dabra
Subhalekha Sudhakar as Shadow
Sridhar as Jayadev
Rajanala as Vishachi 
Rallapalli as Santana Pakir
P. J. Sarma as Priest
Bhimaraju as Khadra
Juttu Narasimham as Paidithalli
Jayachitra as Sidhaswari Devi
Sangeeta as Sarada
Rajyalakshmi as Poornima
Roja Ramani in a special appearance
Anitha as Saku
Nirmalamma as Thulasi's Bamma
Baby Seeta as Archana

Soundtrack

The music was composed by Chakravarthy. The lyrics were written by Veturi. The music was released on Saptaswar Audio Company.

Others
 VCDs and DVDs on SHALIMAR Video Company, Hyderabad

References

Indian horror thriller films
1980s Telugu-language films
1980s horror thriller films
1986 horror films
1986 films
Films scored by K. Chakravarthy
Films based on novels by Yandamuri Veerendranath
Films based on Indian novels